Alojz Fandel  was a former Slovak football player and coach. He played for FC Spartak Trnava.

Career
Fandel appeared in the UEFA Cup 1974–75 for Dukla Prague.

After he retired from playing, Fandel became a football manager. He led TJ SH Senica before resigning in 2001.

References

Living people
Slovak footballers
Slovak football managers
Czechoslovak footballers
FC Spartak Trnava players
Association footballers not categorized by position
Year of birth missing (living people)